Richard Tocchet (born April 9, 1964) is a Canadian professional ice hockey coach and former player. He is the head coach of the Vancouver Canucks of the National Hockey League (NHL). Playing as a right winger, he played 18 seasons in the National Hockey League (NHL) for the Philadelphia Flyers, Pittsburgh Penguins, Los Angeles Kings, Boston Bruins, Washington Capitals, and Phoenix Coyotes. He was the head coach of the NHL's Tampa Bay Lightning for two seasons and the Arizona Coyotes for four seasons. During the 2010 playoffs, he was an analyst on Flyers Postgame Live on Comcast SportsNet and was a studio analyst for NHL on TNT.

Playing career
Tocchet was born in the Toronto suburb of Scarborough, Ontario. As a youth, Tocchet played in the 1977 Quebec International Pee-Wee Hockey Tournament with a minor ice hockey team from Toronto.

After being drafted in the sixth round (121st overall) by the Philadelphia Flyers in the 1983 NHL Entry Draft, Tocchet returned to the OHL's Sault Ste. Marie Greyhounds for another year of junior hockey. After registering 108 points with Sault Ste. Marie, Tocchet came to the Flyers for the 1984–85 season, scoring 39 points and helping the team to the Stanley Cup Finals. He was mainly known as a fighter in his early career, but soon developed his skills enough to become a respected power forward, a team leader and a four-time NHL All-Star. He had memorable fights with other power forwards such as Wendel Clark and Cam Neely.

In 1992, Tocchet was traded to the Pittsburgh Penguins, along with Kjell Samuelsson and Ken Wregget, in exchange for Mark Recchi. In 14 playoff games, he scored 19 points, helping the Penguins repeat as Stanley Cup champions.

Tocchet became a well-travelled veteran in the league after his stint with the Penguins, taking roles with the Los Angeles Kings, Boston Bruins, Washington Capitals, and Phoenix Coyotes. He was dealt along with Adam Oates and Bill Ranford from the Bruins to the Capitals for Anson Carter, Jason Allison, Jim Carey, a third-round selection in the 1997 draft (63rd overall–Lee Goren) and a conditional second-round pick in the 1998 draft in a blockbuster deal on March 1, 1997. Both Tocchet and Carter would work together as studio analysts with the NHL on TNT nearly a quarter of a century later beginning in 2021. Tocchet became an unrestricted free agent on June 15, 1997 and signed a three-year contract with the Phoenix Coyotes 23 days later on July 8. After returning to the Flyers in a trade that sent Mikael Renberg to the Coyotes on March 8, 2000, he added 11 points en route to an Eastern Conference Finals berth. Tocchet retired after the 2001–02 season, being one of several players in NHL history to collect 400 goals and 2,000 penalty minutes including Brendan Shanahan and Gary Roberts.

Coaching career
Tocchet became an assistant coach for the Colorado Avalanche in 2002–03. In the summer of 2005, he became an assistant coach with the Phoenix Coyotes. On December 17, 2005, Tocchet took over as interim head coach for Phoenix, stepping in while head coach Wayne Gretzky was out on an indefinite leave of absence due to his mother's illness (and subsequent death). The team went 2–3–0 under Tocchet. Gretzky eventually resumed his duties on December 28.

Tocchet was named as the associate coach of the Tampa Bay Lightning on July 9, 2008. On November 16, he was named the interim head coach of the Lightning, replacing Barry Melrose who was fired two days earlier after compiling a 5–7–4 record. Tocchet lost his first game to the Carolina Hurricanes in a shootout. Tocchet's first win came two games later on November 21 against the Nashville Predators. However, he would go on to lose his next nine games, and twelve of the next thirteen. On May 11, 2009 Tocchet had the interim tag removed and was signed to a two-year deal by the Lightning. On April 12, 2010 he was relieved of his coaching duties by the new ownership of the Tampa Bay Lightning. On June 25, 2014, he was hired by the Pittsburgh Penguins to be an assistant coach. On June 12, 2016, Tocchet won the Stanley Cup with the Penguins. He won his second Stanley Cup as a coach on June 11, 2017, when the Penguins defeated the Nashville Predators in six games.

On July 11, 2017, Tocchet was named head coach for the Arizona Coyotes. On February 29, 2020, Tocchet earned his 100th win as head coach of the Coyotes in a 5–2 victory over the Buffalo Sabres. At the conclusion of the 2020–21 season, Tocchet and the Coyotes mutually agreed to part ways.

On January 22, 2023, Tocchet was named head coach for the Vancouver Canucks.

Analyst
After leaving Tampa Bay, Tocchet served alongside Michael Barkann, Al Morganti, Bill Clement, and Steve Coates as a Flyers Postgame Live panelist on Comcast SportsNet.

He joined TNT's hockey coverage in 2021 as a studio analyst.

Gambling incident
On February 6, 2006, Tocchet was served with a criminal complaint, accused of financing a nationwide sports gambling ring based in New Jersey in which several current NHL players wagered. The ring was discovered by New Jersey state police, in the undercover investigation Operation Slapshot. "It's not a hockey-related issue, it's a football thing. And at this time I can't comment any further," Tocchet told The Arizona Republic after the Coyotes practiced on February 7, 2006.

On May 8, 2006, attorneys for Tocchet and Gretzky's wife Janet Jones filed notices in New Jersey that they intended to sue the state for $50 million each for defamation. Both Tocchet and Jones claimed to have lost business opportunities in the wake of the state's investigation, which had sullied their reputations.

On August 3, 2006, former New Jersey state trooper James Harney pleaded guilty to conspiracy, promoting gambling, and official misconduct, and promised to help authorities with their case against Tocchet and others. Harney said that he and Tocchet were 50–50 partners in the betting ring.

On May 25, 2007, Tocchet pleaded guilty to conspiracy and promoting gambling. New Jersey Attorney General Anne Milgram announced on August 17, 2007, that Tocchet had been sentenced to two years probation in exchange for his plea. He could have received up to five years in New Jersey state prison, but there is a presumption against incarceration for first-time offenders who plead guilty to such crimes. 

The NHL issued a statement from Gary Bettman, but his spokesman would not answer questions, including if Tocchet had a future in hockey.

During a press conference on February 6, 2008, it was announced that Tocchet was to be reinstated, and would serve as assistant coach the next day, exactly two years after taking a leave of absence. Among other conditions of his reinstatement, Tocchet was ordered by Bettman to abstain from all forms of gambling.

Awards
 3-time Stanley Cup champion with the Pittsburgh Penguins: 1992 (as player), 2016 (as assistant coach); and 2017 (as assistant coach).
 Selected to four NHL All-Star Games: 1989, 1990, 1991 and 1993
 Inducted into Flyers Hall of Fame: 2021

Records
 Philadelphia Flyers all-time leader in Gordie Howe hat tricks – 9
 NHL all-time leader in Gordie Howe hat tricks – 18 (includes post-season)

Career statistics

Regular season and playoffs

International

Head coaching record

 Shortened season due to the COVID-19 pandemic during the 2019–20 season. Playoffs were played in August 2020 with a different format.

See also
 Operation Slapshot
 Captain (ice hockey)
 Power forward (ice hockey)
 List of NHL players with 100-point seasons
 List of NHL players with 1,000 games played
 List of NHL players with 2,000 career penalty minutes

References

External links
 

1964 births
Living people
Arizona Coyotes coaches
Boston Bruins players
Canadian ice hockey coaches
Canadian ice hockey right wingers
Canadian people of Italian descent
Colorado Avalanche coaches
Los Angeles Kings players
National Hockey League All-Stars
Philadelphia Flyers captains
Philadelphia Flyers draft picks
Philadelphia Flyers players
Phoenix Coyotes players
Pittsburgh Penguins coaches
Pittsburgh Penguins players
Sault Ste. Marie Greyhounds players
Sportspeople from Scarborough, Toronto
Ice hockey people from Toronto
Stanley Cup champions
Tampa Bay Lightning coaches
Vancouver Canucks coaches
Washington Capitals players